Bruce Alan Hardy (born June 1, 1956 in Murray, Utah), is a former professional American football player who was selected by the Miami Dolphins in the 9th round of the 1978 NFL Draft. A 6'5", 232 lbs. tight end from Arizona State University, Hardy played his entire NFL career with the Dolphins from 1978-1989. He was married to Joanie Hardy for 20 years and has four sons: Nathan, Adam, Aaron and Matthew. He coached in the Arena Football League for the Florida Bobcats before coaching for Florida International University.

In 1974, while in high school, Hardy appeared on the cover of Sports Illustrated.

Career Receiving Stats
 151 Games
 256 Receptions
 2,455 Yards
 9.6 Avg.
 25 Touchdowns

References

External links
 SI Classic Covers: Utah's Bruce Hardy
 SI Vault: Bruce Hardy, three-sport star

1956 births
Living people
American football tight ends
Arizona State Sun Devils football players
Miami Dolphins players
Florida Bobcats coaches
FIU Panthers football coaches
Players of American football from Utah
People from Murray, Utah